IG Culture  is a London musician and performer best known as a pioneer of the broken beat movement. His production features rhythms and hybrids of several musical styles such as jazz-fusion, funk and soul.

Musical career

IG Culture first became known as a member of the hip-hop duo Dodge City Productions in 1990. After the demise of that outfit, he founded an independent record label One Drop Interouter which released four albums. Later, he worked with the People label and founded the Main Squeeze label.  He now runs the CoOp presents label with Alex Phountzi.

IG Culture produced an album by Japanese jazz artist Monday Michiru - Jazz Brat - in 1995 and appeared on the Roots Manuva album Brand New Second Hand in 1999.
In 2001, he compiled and released a various-artists album called Inspirations album followed by a 2-CD set of the same name in 2003. He also produced  tracks from the Les Nubians album One Step Forwardincluding the title track released in 2003. In 2019 Ig Culture returned to the studio and completed work on a new album which is a soundtrack to a theater dance show, the OST was titled EarthBound and is due for release late in 2019

New Sector Movements

Circa 2000, IG Culture founded the New Sector Movements project. While predominantly consisting of work by Culture himself, the project also serves as a collective featuring a number of broken beat artists such as Eric "Murky Waters" Appapoulay, Eska Mtungwazi, Kaidi "Agent K" Tatham, Julie Dexter and Kate "Bémbé Ségué" Phillips, as well as Frank McComb (ex-Buckshot LeFonque) and strings duo Chix With Stix (Izzy Dunn & Stella Page). New Sector Movements signed with Virgin Records and its debut release was the 2001 EP No Tricks, which was followed by the Download This album later the same year. In 2004 the project released its second album Turn It Up, this time credited to NSM.

Discography

 The Clarity EP 1992 as Dodge City Productions
 No Tricks EP 2001 with New Sector Movements
 Download This 2001 with New Sector Movements
 Inspirations 2001
 Inspirations (2CD) 2003
 Turn It Up 2004
 Zen Badizm 2008 available only in Japan
 Soulful Shanghai 2012

References

External links
IG Culture / New Sector Movements / NSM / Instant Graffix / Quango / Son Of Scientist discographies at Discogs

IG Culture at MySpace
Interview with IG Culture on release of album Turn It Up in 2004, on Futureboogie website

English male rappers
English record producers
Rappers from London
Living people
Year of birth missing (living people)